Pazhaya Vannarapettai is a 2016 Indian Tamil-language political drama film written and directed by Mohan G. Kshatriyan. The music has been composed by Jubin and the film was released on 2 December 2016.

Cast
Prajin as Karthik
Ashmitha
Richard Rishi as ACP Moorthy
Nishanth as Dheena
Karunas
Robo Shankar
'Salim' Ashmitha
Kaajal Pasupathi as Silk
Tashu Kaushik

Production

A political crime thriller, stars  Prajin in the lead. Asmitha will be seen romancing Prajin in the movie, also stars Richard who plays a police officer, while Karunas essays a crucial role. At the audio launch of 'Pazhaya Vannarapettai', which is based on real-life incidents that took place in Film Director  Mohan's life.

Soundtrack 
The film's soundtrack was composed by Jubin.

Release 
The film was released on 2 December 2016. Satellite rights were sold to Kalaingar TV which premiered on 14 January 2017 on Pongal.

Reception

Critical reception 
The film received mixed reviews from both critics and audience.

Sify gave 3 out of 5 stars and said "Pazhaya Vannarapettai has its moments but the amateurish performances spoil the show."

Anupama Subramaniam from Deccan Chronicle wrote "Cinematographer Farooq does a great job with his lighting and composition and brings alive the milieu of the movie. Music is functional.  An honest attempt from a debutant — definitely worth a watch!

M Suganth of The Times of India rated the film with 3/5 stars stating that the director shows confidence in film making with good support from cinematographer Farooq who captured the 'nocturnal sights' of north Madras so real that makes the viewer difficult to believe that the film is actually a low budget fare.

References

External links 
 

2010s Tamil-language films
2016 films
Films set in Chennai
Films shot in Chennai
Indian political drama films
2016 directorial debut films